North Governorate (Lebanese pr. eš šmél) (French: Gouvernorat du Liban-Nord) is one of the governorates of Lebanon. Its capital is Tripoli. Ramzi Nohra has been its governor since May 2, 2014. The population of North Governorate is 731,251.

Districts
North Governorate is divided into districts, or aqdya.  The districts are listed below (capitals in parentheses):

Batroun (Batroun)
Bsharri (Bsharri)
Koura (Amioun)
Miniyeh-Danniyeh District (Miniyeh)
Tripoli (Tripoli)
Zgharta (Zgharta / Ehden)

A law was passed in 2003 by former Prime Minister Rafik Hariri to separate Akkar District from North Governorate and form a new governorate, Akkar Governorate. Implementation of Akkar Governorate began in 2014 with the appointment of its first governor.

Religion in North Governorate

Sunnis make up the overwhelming majority in the city of Tripoli and the Minyeh and Danniyeh districts with some presence in Zgharta and the Koura districts, Alawites are present only in a small part in the city of Tripoli, while Christians make up the overwhelming majority in Zgharta, Batroun, Bsharri and Koura districts (91% based on registered voters). According to the 2018 general election, 52.9% of the electorate was Sunni, while 44% was Christian, mainly Maronites and Orthodox; a very small percentage was Alawite or Shia Muslim. This however does not include the population under 18 years nor non-nationals (including both Syrians and Palestinians).

Electoral Constituencies and Confessional Distribution 

The North governorate is divided into two separate electoral constituencies: North I (Tripoli-Minnieh-Danniyeh) and North II (Batroun-Zghorta-Koura-Bsharri).

North II's seats are distributed as follows:

 8 Sunni Muslims (5 in Tripoli, 1 in Minnieh, 2 in Dennieh)
 1 Alawite Muslim (in Tripoli)
 1 Maronite Christian (in Tripoli)
 1 Orthodox Christian (in Tripoli)

North III's seats are distributed as follows:

 7 Maronite (2 in Batroun, 2 in Bsharri, 3 in Zgharta)
 3 Orthodox (all in Koura district)

References

 
Governorates of Lebanon